Cornale is a comune (municipality) in the Province of Pavia in the Italian region Lombardy, located about 50 km southwest of Milan and about 25 km southwest of Pavia. As of 31 December 2004, it had a population of 732 and an area of 1.7 km².

Cornale borders the following municipalities: Bastida de' Dossi, Casei Gerola, Isola Sant'Antonio, Mezzana Bigli.

Demographic evolution

References

Cities and towns in Lombardy